The 2017 Ivan Hlinka Memorial Tournament was an under-18 international ice hockey tournament held in Břeclav, Czech Republic and Bratislava, Slovakia from 7 to 12 August 2017.

Preliminary round
All times are Central European Summer Time (UTC+2).

Group A

Group B

Final round

Seventh place game

Fifth place game

Semifinals

Bronze medal game

Final

Final standings

External links
 Ivan Hlinka Memorial 2017 
 U18 Ivan Hlinka Memorial 2017/2018 

Ivan Hlinka Memorial Tournament
2017
International ice hockey competitions hosted by Slovakia
International ice hockey competitions hosted by the Czech Republic
Ivan
Ivan